The Carl Gustaf 20 mm recoilless rifle, service name 20 mm pansarvärnsgevär m/42 (20 mm pvg m/42), meaning "20 mm antitank rifle model 1942", was the first recoilless rifle produced by Carl Gustafs Stads Gevärsfaktori.

Design 
The Carl Gustaf 20 mm pvg m/42 fired the 20×180mm rimmed cartridge which had two cutouts in the bottom of the casing. A seal covered these cutouts and when the cartridge was discharged, this seal was blown out the back of the weapon, expelling some of the propellant gases rearward and counteracting the effects of recoil produced by the projectile accelerating down the barrel. The breech plate had to be replaced after firing twenty rounds of armor-piercing ammunition or after forty rounds of practice or high-explosive.

Unlike comparable anti-tank rifles of the era the 20 mm pvg m/42 was shipped with both high-explosive and armor-piercing projectiles. The AP round was tungsten-cored and had a tracer variant known as the slpprj m/42. The impact-fuzed HE projectile was known as the sgr m/43. The 20 mm pvg m/42 being a recoilless rifle was also much lighter and more portable than contemporary 20 mm anti-tank rifles. The 20 mm pvg m/42 was equipped with iron sights ranged to 300 metres and a detachable Meopta ZF-4 optical sight. 

The 20 mm pvg m/42 was the world's first shoulder-fired recoil-less weapon, and laid the ground work for the development of the more well-known Carl Gustaf 8.4cm recoilless rifle, which continues to see widespread military service.

Service History 
By 1942 the armor penetration of the 20 mm pvg m/42 and anti-tank rifles was generally inadequate in the face of improvements in tank armor. Despite this, orders for 3,219 ATRs were placed, with deliveries between August 1942 and July 1944.  The first 500 were faulty, and used only for training until they were repaired. By the end of World War II only 1,000 had been delivered.

The Provisional Irish Republican Army acquired at least one 20 mm pvg m/42 recoilless rifle in the early 1980s and first used the weapon in the summer of 1983, carrying out a number of attacks on British Army and Royal Ulster Constabulary fortified observation posts and armored vehicles in Belfast.

Users 
 
  Provisional Irish Republican Army

References 

Rifles of Sweden
Anti-tank rifles